Red Alert are аn English punk/oi!-band, formed in Sunderland, England, in May 1979. The group released five EPs and a studio album, and appeared on numerous compilations, including Punk And Disorderly (Abstract Records, 1981) and Carry On Oi! (Secret Records, 1981). Three of the band's releases reached the Top 30 in the UK Indie Chart. Red Alert broke up in 1984, reformed five years later and continued touring and recording.

Band history 
Red Alert's original line-up — Steve 'Cast Iron' Smith (vocals), Tony Van Frater (guitar), Gaz Stuart (bass) and Dona (drums) — debuted in the summer of 1979, at a carnival in Sunderland, performing mostly Clash and UK Subs covers.

Their first demo became their debut release: a self-financed four track EP Third And Final, only 250 copies of which were pressed and then sold at gigs. With the new drummer Gary 'Mitch' Mitchell the band produced its second demo In Britain and recorded two tracks for the Carry On Oi! compilation, only one of which -"SPG"- was included. Gary Bushell suggested that the band should send their material to No Future Records which they did and were signed a week later.

In the course of two years Red Alert released two 7-inch EPs (In Britain, Take No Prisoners), their debut LP We've Got The Power, a single ("City Invasion") and a 6 track 12-inch EP (There's A Guitar Burning), all with new drummer Les 'Nobby' Cobb. Matty Forster replaced Cobb in 1984. This change bore little fruit: disillusioned and weary, the band called it quits; the band's last gig was a benefit for the miners' strike. For some time Tony and Matty toured with Red London.

In 1989, all four original members of Red Alert started meeting again, at a new Kazbah club, opened in Sunderland. In early 1990 the reformed band did a gig with Red London and Attila the Stockbroker and, inspired by their warm reception, decided to go on — with the exception of Gaz, who was replaced by Tom Spencer.

After touring Western Europe alongside Red London, the quartet (with Gaz Stoker of Red London, as a new bassist) recorded their second LP Blood, Sweat 'N' Beers, released on Nightmare Records in Germany. Beyond The Cut (Nightmare/Knockout) followed in 1993.

With new drummer John Forster (Matty's brother) and later Lainey of Leatherface the band toured the United States and released the Super Yobs album, a split with The Templars. On return they released the "Street Survivors"/"Drinkin' With Red Alert" double 7-inch EP set.

In August 1994, new drummer Ian Syborn joined; with him in 1995-96 the band recorded Breakin' All The Rules CD for Dojo Records. Shortly after the release Lainey returned, this time as bassist. This line-up recorded Wearside, released by PlasticHead Records to coincide with the 1999 Red Alert - The Rarities compilation (20 previously unreleased tracks) on Captain Oi! Records.

Red Alert's latest studio album Excess All Areas was released in 2005.

Line up
The band's current lineup includes:
Guitar- Mick Jones
Bass- Dave Jones
Drums- Axel Klempin

Ian Syborn died in 2002. Tony Van Frater died on 29 October 2015. Steve "Cast Iron" Smith died in Spain on 30 November 2022.

Discography

Singles and EPs
 Third and Final EP (Guardian Records) 1980 [reissued as Border Guards EP (Combat Rock Records) 1994)]
 In Britain EP (No Future Records) 1982
 Take No Prisoners EP (No Future Records) 1982
 "City Invasion"/"Negative Reaction" (No Future Records) 1983
 There’s a Guitar Burning EP (No Future Records) 1983
 We've Got the Power EP Live In Mondreagon (Capita Swing Records) 1992
 "Drinkin' with Red Alert" / "Street Survivors" (EP, Nightmare Records / Knockout Records) 1994
 "Visca El Barça" (Plastic Disk Records) 1996
 “Double Aye/Eh Side” 
 Split EP w/Rough Cuts (Cursed Blessings Records) 2021

Albums
 We’ve Got the Power (No Future Records LP, CD) 1983
 Blood, Sweat 'N' Beers (Nightmare Records LP, CD 1992
 Beyond the Cut (Nightmare Records / Knockout Records) 1993
 Super Yobs (split with The Templars) (Vulture Records) 1994
 Breakin' All the Rules (Dojo Records CD) 1996
 Wearside (Plastic Head Records CD) 1999
 Excess All Areas (Captain Oi!, 2005)

Compilation albums
 Red Alert: Oi Singles Collection (Captain Oi! Records CD) 1995
 Rebels in Society (Get Back Records CD) 1997
 The Rarities (Captain Oi! Records CD) 1999
 Best Of (Captain Oi! Records CD) 2000
 Border Guards (Harry May, 2001)
 Blazin' Thru The Years - The Best Of (2005)

Compilation appearances
 Punk and Disorderly (Abstract Records) 1981
 Carry On Oi! (Secret Records) 1981
 Angels With Dirty Faces (No Future Records) 1984
 There Is No Future.. (No Future Records) 1984
 Maggie, Maggie, Maggie; Out! Out! Out! (Anagram Records) 1987
 Kids on the Street (Bird Records) 1993
 The Bright Side Of Oi (Street Kids Records) 1994
 LA Compilation (Combat Rock Records) 1995
 Knock Out in the 1st Round (Knockout Records) 1996
 Oi! The Rarities Vol 1 (Captain Oi! Records) 1995
 No Future Punk Singles Collection Vol 1 (Captain Oi! Records) 1995
 No Future Punk Singles Collection Vol 2 (Captain Oi! Records) 1996
 Oi! Against Racism (Havin' A Laugh Records) 1996
 War is Insanity (Knockout / Banda Bonnot Records) 1996
 On the Streets (We Bite Records) 1997
 We Are the Firm (Cockney Rejects tribute) (1,2,3,4 Records) 1998
 We Are the People (Angelic Upstarts tribute) (Knockout Records) 1998
 Voice of a New Generation (Blitz tribute) (Plastichead Records) 1999

References

Further reading
Kid Stoker, Red Alert: The Story So Far, Street Music Publishing, 2000

External links
 Red Alert @ UK 82
 

English punk rock groups
Musical groups established in 1979
People from Sunderland
Musicians from Tyne and Wear
Oi! groups